E 311 (known in Arabic as شارع ﺇ ٣١١) is a major road in the United Arab Emirates. It begins in New Al Falah in Abu Dhabi and extends north-eastward towards the Ras al-Khaimah emirate.  E 311 has been called Sheikh Mohammad Bin Zayed Road since January 2013 and is commonly known as SMBZ Road. Prior to that it was called Emirates Road, but that name is now given to E 611, which was previously Dubai Bypass Road.

It was originally designed by the Dubai Municipality to cut the traffic of heavy vehicles from the downtown area.  However, due to a very bad road infrastructure in Sharjah, traffic bottle-necks are often seen near Dubai–Sharjah border. In 2006 it was re-developed by RTA in Dubai, creating 6 lanes on each side.

In mid-2005, the road was extended to reach the UAE's northernmost emirate of Ras al-Khaimah, passing through the emirates of Ajman, Umm al-Quwain and Sharjah. There is also a project to extend the E 311 through Ras al-Khaimah to the UAE's northern border with Oman (Musandam Peninsula).

In Dubai, Sheikh Mohammad Bin Zayed Road is a prime location for new projects as the area surrounding it can now be accessed easily. Many projects have been proposed or are in various stages of development along the road, including International City, Arabian Ranches, Dubailand, Dubai Silicon Oasis, Global Village, Dubai Sports City Hessa street exit.

Within the city of Dubai, Sheikh Mohammad Bin Zayed Road used to be known as the most dangerous road in the UAE, with 19 fatalities recorded on it within the first six months of 2006. But with improved road designs and replacement of several roundabouts with interchanges, flyovers, speed cameras and increase in lanes, it has become much safer to drive. This road is also used to commute from Jebel Ali area in Dubai to the old town of Dubai such as Bur Dubai and Deira. Sheikh Mohammad Bin Zayed Road is located in the east of Dubai, parallel to Sheikh Zayed Road (E11). People also use the Sheikh Mohammad Bin Zayed Road as an alternative to the Sheik Zayed Road which has open road toll gates, SALIK that deducts AED 4 every time a vehicle passes beneath them.

On 1 January 2013, Sheikh Mohammed Bin Rashid Al Maktoum, ruler of Dubai, ordered that the E 311 highway in Dubai be renamed from Emirates Road to Sheikh Mohammed Bin Zayed Road, in a tribute to General Sheikh Mohammed bin Zayed Al Nahyan, Crown Prince of Abu Dhabi, for his role in advancing inclusive development nationwide.

In 2015, a foreign crane driver attempted to hang himself after parking the crane in the middle of the road. Non-payment of wages was suspected to be the main reason behind this suicide attempt. Shocked motorists called police who were able to negotiate with the driver; it has been reported that he will face charges for attempted suicide.

In November 2016, an extension of E 311 from the Jebel Ali Free Zone in Dubai to New Al Falah in Abu Dhabi opened. The total project cost US$2.1 billion and carries four lanes both ways, with a capacity of 8,000 vehicles an hour. The extension offers an alternative to E 11, which formerly was the only highway connecting the two most populated emirates.

References

2001 establishments in the United Arab Emirates
Roads in the United Arab Emirates
Transport in Dubai
Transport in the Emirate of Abu Dhabi
Transport in the Emirate of Sharjah